Simon Zimny (May 18, 1927 – April 3, 2007) was a French professional footballer who played as a defender.

Personal life
Zimny was born in France, and was of Polish descent.

References

External links
 FFF Profile

1927 births
2007 deaths
Sportspeople from Pas-de-Calais
French footballers
France international footballers
French people of Polish descent
Association football defenders
Ligue 1 players
Stade de Reims players
Stade Français (association football) players
French football managers
US Nœux-les-Mines players
Footballers from Hauts-de-France